St John the Evangelist's Church lies to the southeast of the village of Chelford, Cheshire, England.  The church is recorded in the National Heritage List for England as a designated Grade II* listed building.  It is an active Anglican parish church in the diocese of Chester, the archdeaconry of Macclesfield and the deanery of Knutsford.  Its benefice is combined with that of St Peter, Lower Withington.

History

The original church on the site was probably a medieval timber-framed chapel.  This was replaced in 1774–76 with a church that was little more than a "plain brick box with slightly pointed windows".  The west tower was added in 1840, and the chancel was extended in 1902.

Architecture

Exterior
The church is constructed in brick with stone dressings and has a slate roof.  Its plan consists of a four-bay nave with a west gallery, a two-bay chancel and a west tower with a recessed spire.  The tower is in three stages with diagonal buttresses and an embattled parapet.  The spire is octagonal, covered with diamond-shaped slates and crowned by a weather vane.  The west front of the tower has an arched doorway and a clock face.

Interior
In the church are 18th-century box pews.  The gallery has been boxed in and converted into a meeting room.  The walls contain paintings in Art Nouveau style.  Also in Art Nouveau style are the pulpit, the altar rails and the choir stalls which were designed by Percy Worthington and which date from 1903.  The chancel has a stone-mosaic floor.  The stained glass includes war memorials of 1920 and 1921, designed by J. H. Dearle, and made by Morris & Co.  In the porch is a memorial window of 2009 by Samantha Land.  In the church is a painted memorial board dated 1654 inscribed with a poem.  There is a ring of six bells dated 1885 by Mears and Stainbank of the Whitechapel Bell Foundry.

External features
The churchyard contains the war grave of a First World War soldier of the Cheshire Regiment.

See also

Grade II* listed buildings in Cheshire East
Listed buildings in Chelford

References

Church of England church buildings in Cheshire
Grade II* listed churches in Cheshire
Churches completed in 1776
18th-century Church of England church buildings
Diocese of Chester
St John the Evangelist's Church, Chelford
Art Nouveau church buildings in the United Kingdom